Thomas Saxon is an American former Negro league pitcher who played in the 1940s.

Saxon played for the New York Cubans in 1942. In three recorded appearances on the mound, he posted a 3.72 ERA over 9.2 innings.

References

External links
 and Seamheads

Year of birth missing
Place of birth missing
New York Cubans players
Date of birth missing
Baseball pitchers